The Jam Tour was a summer and fall music concert tour in 2009 by American R&B singer Erykah Badu. The tour started on May 24 in Los Angeles, Badu played dates across North America twice and Europe, which ended in Dallas, Texas on October 16. During the North America second leg, Badu was featured as a special guest co-headliner on hip-hop artist Mos Def's Ecstatic Tour on select September dates.

Prior to the start of tour, Badu performed two shows in April at the New Orleans Jazz Festival. Her fifth studio album, New Amerykah Part Two (Return of the Ankh) was released the following year in March 2010.

Opening act
 Jay Electronica (USA—Leg 2)

Set list
"A Milli" (Intro Interlude)
"Amerykahn Promise"  
"The Healer"
"Me"
"My People"
"Soldier" 1
"On & On" / "...& On"
"Orange Moon" 1
"Didn't Cha Know?"
"That Hump" 1
"Back in the Day (Puff)" (contain elements of "Juicy Fruit")
"Appletree"
Michael Jackson Tribute: "Off the Wall" 
"I Want You"
"Love of My Life (An Ode to Hip-Hop)" (contain elements of "Rapper's Delight" and "Gangsta Gangsta")
"Love of My Life Worldwide"
"Black Ghost" (reprise)
"Otherside of the Game"
"The Healer" (reprise)
"A Milli" (Outro Interlude)

1 performed on select dates in Europe and the U.S.

Notes
The song "A Milli" by hip-hop rapper Lil Wayne was featured as opening and closing instrumental for Badu's set list for the tour.

Tour dates

Note
 All of  the U.S. dates may not be listed

References

Erykah Badu concert tours
2009 concert tours